Gene O'Neill is best known as a multi-award nominated writer of science fiction, fantasy, and horror fiction.

O'Neill's professional writing career began after completing the Clarion West Writers Workshop in 1979.  Since that time, over 100 of his works have been published.  His short story work has appeared in Cemetery Dance Magazine, Twilight Zone Magazine, The Magazine of Fantasy and Science Fiction, and many more.

O'Neill has had many occupations besides writing including postal worker, contract specialist for AAFES, college basketball player, amateur boxer, United States Marine, right-of-way agent, and vice president of a small manufacturing plant.  He also holds two degrees from California State University, Sacramento and University of Minnesota. He currently writes full-time and lives in the Napa Valley with his wife, Kay.

Awards and honors
Besides having his stories reprinted worldwide, including Russia, Spain, and France, he has received many other honors including:
The Taste of Tenderloin received a 2009 starred review in Publishers Weekly
The Confessions of St. Zach received a "Best Small Press Chill" Black Quill Award nomination from Dark Scribe in 2009

Bram Stoker Awards
Taste of Tenderloin won the Bram Stoker Award for Best Fiction Collection in 2010
The Confessions of St. Zach received a Bram Stoker Award nomination for Best Long Fiction in 2009
"Balance", received a Bram Stoker Award nomination for Best Short Fiction in 2007

Select bibliography

Novels and novellas
The Confessions of St. Zach (Bad Moon Books, 2008)
Collected Tales of the Baja Express (Delirium Books, 2006)
White Tribe (Elder Signs Press, 2007)
Lost Tribe (Bad Moon Books, 2009)
The Grand Struggle (Prime Books, 2004)
Not Fade Away (forthcoming, 2010)

Sacramento detective series
Shadow of the Dark Angel (Dominion, 2002 / Bad Moon Books, 2009) 
Deathflash (Bad Moon Books, 2009)
Double Jack (Bad Moon Books, 2011)

Cal Wild series
The Burden of Indigo (Prime Books, 2002)
The Armless Conductor (The Magazine of Fantasy and Science Fiction)  (September, 1987)
The Confessions of St. Zach (Bad Moon Books, 2008)
Doc Good's Travelling Show (Bad Moon Books, 2009)
The Great Northern Sweetwater Raid novella featured in the collection called Sideshow Exhibits (Sideshow Press, 2010)
Jade (Bad Moon Books, 2010)

Short stories
Stories from anthologies and magazines:
"The Burden of Indigo" Twilight Zone Magazine (October, 1981)
"The Affective Connection" Pulpsmith (1982)
"Dakota Safari" Twilight Zone Magazine (April, 1983)
"Alchemy" The Magazine of Fantasy and Science Fiction (May, 1983)
"It's in Their Eyes" from the anthology Damnations edited by R. K. Leming (Miskatonic University Press, 1984)
"300 S. Montgomery" The Magazine of Fantasy and Science Fiction (July, 1984)
"The Shadow of the Mountain" The Magazine of Fantasy and Science Fiction (March, 1985)
"The White Quetzal" The Magazine of Fantasy and Science Fiction (July 1985)
"The Armless Conductor" The Magazine of Fantasy and Science Fiction (September, 1987)
"Live Oak" from the anthology Men and Women of Letters, edited by John Yewell (1988)
"With Grace" Tales of the Unanticipated (Spring/Summer/Fall, 1990)
"Awaken Dragon" The Magazine of Fantasy and Science Fiction(May, 1990)
"The Beautiful Stranger" Starshore (Spring, 1991)
"The City Never Sleeps" from the anthology Dead End: City Limits edited by David B. Silva and Paul F. Olson (St. Martin's Press, 1991)
"New Kicks" Cemetery Dance Magazine #13 / Volume 4, #3 (Summer, 1992)
"Undercover" Science Fiction Age (November, 1992)
"In the Big Window" Eldritch Tales #29 (Fall, 1993)
"Down on the 01 Level" Science Fiction Age (May, 1994)
"The Ishikawa Proliferation" Tomorrow Speculative Fiction (October, 1995)
"Groundling Dancer" Science Fiction Age (July, 1997)
"The Hitchhiking Effect" Science Fiction Age (May, 1998)
"Flange Turner" from the anthology Hideous Dreams edited by L. H. Maynard, M. P. N. Sims (Cosmos Books/Wildside Press, 2001)
"The Apotheosis of Nathan McKee" from the anthology Unnatural Selection edited by Gord Rollo (Cosmos Books, 2001)
"Dead Cat Meets Frankenpup" from the anthology Dead Cats Bouncing edited by Gerard Houarner & GAK (Necro Publications/Bedlam Press, 2002)
"The Faceless Man" Redsine #8 (April, 2002)
"You Do the Math" Redsine #10 (October, 2002)
"When Legends Die" from the anthology Decadence edited by Monica J. O'Rourke (Prime Books, 2002)
"Jackie" from the anthology Darkness Rising Volume 5: Black Shroud of Fear edited by M. P. N. Sims and L. H. Maynard (Prime Books, 2002)
"Magic Numbers" from the anthology Borderlands 5 edited by Elizabeth E. Monteleone and Thomas F. Monteleone (Borderlands Press, 2003)
"Masquerade" from the anthology Bare Bone #6 edited by Kevin L. Donihe (Raw Dog Screaming Press, 2004)
"White Tribe" from the anthology New Dark Voices edited by Shane Ryan Staley (Delirium Books, 2004)
"Dance of the Blue Lady" Cemetery Dance Magazine #53 (2005)
"Balance" Cemetery Dance Magazine #55 (2006)

Collections
Rockers, Shamans, Manikins & Thanathespians (Silver Lake Publications, 2001) 
Ghost, Spirits, Computers and World Machines (Prime Books, 2001) 
"Introduction" by Kim Stanley Robinson
"Awaken, Dragon"
"The White Quetzal"
"Dakota Safari"
The Burden of Indigo"
"The City Never Sleeps"
"Undercover"
"The Beautiful Stranger"
"Shadow of the Mountain"
"Afterword" by Scott Edelman
The Grand Struggle
The Taste of Tenderloin (Apex Publishing, 2009)  
"Introduction" by Gavin O'Neill (Gene O'Neill's son)
"Lost Patrol"
"Magic Words"
"Tombstones in His Eyes"
"Bushido"
"Balance"
"The Apotheosis of Nathan McKee"
"Bruised Soul"
"5150"
Dance of the Blue Lady and Other Stories (forthcoming, 2010)

References

Additional references and external links

Gene O'Neill's entry on Fantastic Fiction
Gene O'Neill's section at Fictionwise
Interview with Gene O'Neill by Apex Publishing
Interview with Gene O'Neill by ''Fear Zone'
Interview with Gene O'Neill by Really Scary
Interview with Gene O'Neill by Horror Seek

1938 births
21st-century American novelists
American male novelists
Living people
American male short story writers
21st-century American short story writers
21st-century American male writers